Christel Apostel (15 May 1935 – 5 February 2022) was a German politician. She died in Moers on 5 February 2022, at the age of 86.

References

1935 births
2022 deaths
Social Democratic Party of Germany politicians
20th-century German women politicians
People from Duisburg
Recipients of the Cross of the Order of Merit of the Federal Republic of Germany